Nurobod District may refer to:
 Nurobod District, Tajikistan in the Region of Republican Subordination of Tajikistan
 Nurobod District, Uzbekistan in the Samarqand Province of Uzbekistan

District name disambiguation pages